
Laguna Mamornadas is a lake in the Beni Department, Bolivia. At an elevation of 163 m, its surface area is 74.16 km².

Lakes of Beni Department